The Häfeli DH-4 was a Swiss fighter prototype in the late 1910s, build by the Eidgenoessische Konstruktionswerkstaette. The DH-4 was a single-seat fighter based on the successful Häfeli DH-3 design. It was made of wood with fabric covering, and carried one machine gun.

Operational history
The Swiss Air Force trialled it from May 1918 to August 1918, but the DH-4 was found to possess disappointing performance and poor handling. As such only one was ever produced and production ceased in late 1918.

List of operators

Swiss Air Force

Specifications

References

1910s Swiss fighter aircraft
Single-engined tractor aircraft
Aircraft first flown in 1918